Hilal Areeha is a Palestinian football team that played as part of the West Bank Premier League until 2012, when they were relegated to the West Bank First Division.

History
Hilal Areeha was established in 1974 in Jericho, during the Israeli occupation government period.

External links
 Hilal Areeha at kooora.com

Football clubs in the West Bank
Association football clubs established in 1974
1974 establishments in the Israeli Military Governorate